This is a list of wars involving the Republic of China.

Wars involving the Republic of China

See also
 List of Chinese wars and battles
 List of wars involving the People's Republic of China
 List of wars involving Taiwan

References

 
China, Republic of
Wars involving the Republic of China